is a former speed skater from Japan, who represented his native country in three consecutive Winter Olympics in 1992, 1994 and 1998. At Albertville, France, in 1992, he won the silver medal in the men's 500 metres.

References

External links
 
 
 
 

1969 births
Living people
Japanese male speed skaters
Olympic speed skaters of Japan
Olympic silver medalists for Japan
Olympic medalists in speed skating
Speed skaters at the 1992 Winter Olympics
Speed skaters at the 1994 Winter Olympics
Speed skaters at the 1998 Winter Olympics
Medalists at the 1992 Winter Olympics
Asian Games competitors for Japan
Speed skaters at the 1990 Asian Winter Games
Sportspeople from Gunma Prefecture
Universiade medalists in speed skating
World Sprint Speed Skating Championships medalists
Universiade gold medalists for Japan
Competitors at the 1991 Winter Universiade